Ansan OK Financial Group Okman is a South Korean professional volleyball team founded in 2013. They are based in Ansan and are members of the Korea Volleyball Federation (KOVO). Their home arena is Sangnoksu Gymnasium in Ansan.

Honours
V-League
Champions (2): 2014–15, 2015–16

KOVO Cup
Runners-up (3): 2015, 2019, 2021

Season-by-season records

Players

2022−23 team

See also
Rush & Cash

References

External links
Official website 

Volleyball clubs established in 2013
Sport in Gyeonggi Province
Ansan
South Korean volleyball clubs
2013 establishments in South Korea